Augustów Lock - the fifth lock on the Augustów Canal (from the Biebrza River). It is located in Augustów, Poland near National Road No 8 and built between 1825-1826 by cf Eng. Konstanty Jodko It was blown up in 1944 by an army of the Third Reich and  rebuilt in its present form by "HYDROTREST" in the years 1947-1948 Under a new projectit will use of metal gates with  channels of circulation and the gate mechanisms for opening the gates i driven by cranks. The result of these upgrades is  an extension of time of about 7 minutes.

 Location: 32.5 km channel
 Level difference: 2.44 m
 Length: 46.8 m
 Width: 6.02 m
 Gates: metal
 Year built: 1825-1826, rebuilt 1947-1948
 Construction Manager: cf Eng. Konstanty Jodko

References

 
 
 

19th-century establishments in Poland
Locks of Poland
Augustów County
Buildings and structures in Podlaskie Voivodeship